Abimbola Fashola (born 6 April 1965) is a former First Lady of Lagos State and spouse of Babatunde Fashola.

Early life and career
Abimbola Emmanuela Fashola was born on 6 April 1965, in Ibadan, the capital of Oyo State, southwestern Nigeria.
She was trained as secretary at the Lagoon Secretarial College in Lagos, where she obtained a diploma certificate. She later received a certificate in Computer Science from the University of Lagos.
She worked briefly as a trainee journalist at the Daily Sketch before she joined the services of the British Council in 1987 but resigned in 2006 when her husband Babatunde Fashola was nominated as the flag bearer of his party and the governorship candidate of the defunct Action Congress of Nigeria.

Personal life 
Abimbola Fashola is married to the politician Babatunde Fashola. They have two children.

See also
Kofoworola Bucknor
Adejoke Orelope-Adefulire

References

Living people
1965 births
HIV/AIDS activists
Politicians from Ibadan
First Ladies of Lagos State
University of Lagos alumni
Yoruba women in politics
Nigerian Roman Catholics
Yoruba people